The Maria Square is the name or a former name of several squares:

 Mariatorget, a square in Södermalm, central Stockholm
 Prešeren Square, known as the Maria Square before 1905, in Ljubljana, Slovenia